Malmella is a genus of moths in the family Megalopygidae described by Paul Dognin in 1914.

Species
Malmella nigricollis Hopp, 1927
Malmella strigiprima Dognin, 1914

References

Megalopygidae
Megalopygidae genera